The Church of St Mary the Virgin is the oldest parish church of Nottingham, in Nottinghamshire, England. It is the largest church after the Cathedral in the city of Nottingham. The church was Grade I listed by the Department for Digital, Culture, Media and Sport as a building of outstanding architectural or historic interest. It is one of only five Grade I listed buildings in the City of Nottingham.

It is situated on High Pavement at the heart of the historic Lace Market district and is also known as St Mary's in the Lace Market. It is a member of the Major Churches Network, and part of the parish of All Saints', St Mary's and St Peter's, Nottingham.

History
The church is mentioned in the Domesday Book of 1086 and is believed to date back to the Saxon times. The main body of the present building (at least the third on the site) dates from the end of the reign of Edward III (1377) to that of Henry VII (1485–1509). The nave was finished before 1475 and it is notable for its uniformity of gothic perpendicular style. It is likely that the south aisle wall was the first part of the building to be constructed in the early 1380s, with the remainder of the nave and transepts being from the early 15th century. The tower was completed in the reign of Henry VIII.

The church was owned by Lenton Priory from 1108 to 1538 and the monks took the living of the church as Rector, and appointed a Vicar to perform the daily offices.

In 1513, a school was founded in the church by Dame Agnes Mellers as The Free School of the Town of Nottingham. This is now Nottingham High School. In the Foundation Deed, Mellers provided that a Commemoration Service should be held in the church "on the Feast of The Translation of St Richard of Chichester". With the exception of the Goose Fair, it is the most ancient ceremonial event still perpetuated in the City of Nottingham.

George Fox founder of the Religious Society of Friends, commonly known as the Quakers or Friends, was imprisoned in Nottingham in 1649 after interrupting the preacher at St Mary's.

Nottingham Bluecoat School was founded in 1706, and the first lessons were taught in the porch of the church.

For several years from 1716, the church was used to house the town fire engine. It was kept at the west end, and was still there until at least 1770.

St Mary's opened a workhouse in 1726 at the south end of Mansfield Road and ran it until 1834 when responsibility for workhouses was transferred from parishes to secular Boards of Guardians. The workhouse was demolished in 1895 to clear part of the site needed for the construction of the Nottingham Victoria railway station.

The church was closed for 5 years from 1843 for a major restoration. It re-opened on 19 May 1848 when the Bishop of Lincoln John Kaye presided.

First Sunday School
St Mary's pioneered Sunday School education for those children unable to attend a day school. Pupils were taught reading, writing and arithmetic, as well as religious knowledge. The first Sunday School was opened in 1751, 35 years before the generally acknowledged first Sunday School was founded in Gloucester by Robert Raikes.

New parishes created from St Mary's
1822: St Paul's Church, George Street, Nottingham, built as a chapel of ease
1841: Holy Trinity Church, Trinity Square
1844: St John the Baptist's Church, Leenside (destroyed by enemy action in May 1941)
1856: St Mark's Church, Nottingham
1856: St Matthew's Church, Talbot Street
1863: St Ann's Church, Nottingham, with St Andrew's created out of this parish, in 1871
1863: St Luke's Church, Nottingham
1863: St Saviour's, Arkwright Street
1864: All Saints', Raleigh Street, as a chapel of ease (now merged again with St Mary's following the unification with St Peter's and All Saints')
1881: Emmanuel Church, Woodborough Road, in 1885
1888: St Catharine's, St Ann's Well Road, out of the parishes of St Mary, St Mark, St Luke and St Paul
1903: St Bartholomew's Church, Blue Bell Hill Road

Restorations
1762: West front rebuilt by William Hiorne of Warwick in the Classical style.
c1818–20: South aisle restored and crossing vault replaced by William Stretton.
1843: Tower saved from collapse by Lewis Nockalls Cottingham.
1844–1848: Five-year restoration of roofs and west front returned to gothic style by George Gilbert Scott (church closed) at a cost of £9,000,
1848–1860s: Internal restoration by George Gilbert Scott and William Bonython Moffatt.
1872: Chancel reroofed by George Gilbert Scott.
1890: The Chapter House was built by George Frederick Bodley.
1912: The Lady Chapel added by Temple Lushington Moore.
1935: Tower ringing room floor concreted and new bell frame
1940: The Simpson memorial choir vestry added.
1992–93: Exterior fabric restored and cleaned.
2008: New kitchens and toilet facilities.
2013: Removal of the wooden flooring platforms, installation of underfloor heating and new stone floor.

Chantry door
The chantry door is considered to be the oldest surviving door in Nottingham, dating from the 1370s or 1380s. it contains an example of iron work from the medieval period in the locking mechanism.

The chantry room has latterly been used as a bonehouse, a coal store, and a chair store. It now contains a toilet for wheelchair users.

The survival of the door is likely to be due to the fact that it has not been heavily used, and is internal within the church.

List of vicars
Source:

 1086  Aitard
 1228  Thomas de Punignal
 c1235 Nicholas (? of Ostia)
 c1250 Philip de Norhamptone
 c1266 William de Birley
 c1279 Robert de Adinburg
 1289  Richard de Notingham
 1290  John de Ely
 1304  Robert de Dalby
 1313  Henry de Parva Halam
 1317  John de Ludham
 1322  John fil William Cosyn
 1347  John de la Launde
 1347  Robert de Wakebrigge
 1348  Richard de Radclyff
 1348  Roger de Nydingworth
 1349  Richard de Swanyngton
 1351  Thomas Pascayl
 1357  John Chatarez
 1357  John Lorymer, of Hoveden
 1364  John de Stapleford
 1371  William de Sandyacre
 1374  Robert de Retford
 1401  Richard de Chilwell
 1409 William Ode
 1442 William Wryght
 1461 John Hurt, S.T.D.
 1476 Thomas Turner, M.A.
 1498 John Greve, S.T.B.
 1499 Symeon Yates, Dec. B.
 1504 Richard Taverner LL.B.
 1534 Richard Mathew, Dec.B.
 1535 Richard Wylde, M.A.
 1554 Oliver Hawood
 1568 John Louth, LL.B.
 1572 William Underne
 1578 Robert Aldridge
 1616 Oliver Wytherington, M.A.
 1616 John Tolson, S.T.B.
 1617 Ralph Hansby, M.A.
 1635 Edmund Lacock, B.D.
 1645 William Howitt
 1647/8 Nicholas Folkingham
 1649 Jonathan Boole
 1651 John Whitlock M.A. and William Reynolds, M.A.
 1662 George Masterson, M.A.
 1686 Samuel Crowborough, D.D.
 1690 Benjamin Camfield, M.A.
 1694 Timothy Caryl, M.A.
 1698 Edward Clarke, M.A.
 1708 Samuel Berdmore, M.A.
 1723 John Disney, M.A.
 1730 Thomas Berdmore, M.A.
 1743 Scrope Berdmore, D.D.
 1770 Nathan Haines D.D.
 1806 John Bristow, D.D.
 1810 George Hutchinson, M.A.
 1817 George Wilkins, D.D.
 1843 Joshua William Brooks, M.A.
 1864 Francis Morse, M.A.
 1886 John Gray Richardson, M.A.
 1900 Arthur Hamilton Baynes, D.D., Bp.
 1913 Thomas Field, D.D.
 1926 James Geoffrey Gordon, M.A.
 1933 Neville Stuart Talbot, D.D., Bp.
 1943 Robert Henry Hawkins, M.A.
 1958 Douglas Russell Feaver, M.A.
 1973 Michael James Jackson, M.A.
 1991 James Edward McKenzie Neale, B.A.
 2004 Andrew Gilchrist Deuchar B.Th (Priest in charge)
 2009 Christopher Harrison (Priest in charge, appointed Vicar 2011)
 2018 Tom Gillum

Laying on of hands
It was at St Mary's that the practice of laying on of hands by the Bishop during a confirmation service was first observed ca. 1760 and documented by Thomas Newton, Bishop of Bristol.<ref>The Lives of Dr. Edward Pocock: the celebrated orientalist. Leonard Twells, Zachary Pearce, Thomas Newton, Samuel Burdy, A.C. 1816</ref> It was performed by John Gilbert, Archbishop of York.

Features

Bronze doors

The bronze doors were designed in 1904 by Henry Wilson in memory of his father-in-law, Rev. Francis Morse.

The intention of the design of the doors is to illustrate the Life of Our Lord in its relation with the Holy Mother to whom the church is dedicated and by the general treatment to suggest the idea of pity.

In the tympanum enclosed within a vesica the Holy Mother supports and cherishes the body of Christ, while in the spandrels, on either side, the gates of Death and Life are suggested: the Dove, typifying the spirit, enters weary into the one and issues strong-winged from the other, thus symbolising the unending round of Death and Life.

The dedicatory inscription "In loving memory of Francis Morse, 1818–1886, Father, Pastor, Friend" in the form of a pierced cresting, divides the tympanum from the doors themselves. These are formed into panels by mouldings of beaten bronze, with angel bosses at the intersections.

On each leaf of the door are five panels, in relief, illustrating the Life of Our Lord, the subjects on the left leaf being “The Annunciation,” with Gabriel appearing at the Virgin's window in the early morning; “The Visitation,” with the Virgin running to meet her kinswoman. Below these come “The Nativity,” followed by “The Epiphany,” and the lowest panel shows the Salvator Mundi on a Cross of branching vine. At the foot of the Cross stand Adam and Eve, conscious of the fall, while the doves of peace and pardon hover overhead.

The subjects of the panels on the right door of the leaf are “The flight into Egypt”; “The Baptism in the Jordan”; “The entry into Jerusalem”; The three Maries at the Sepulchre”; and “The Resurrection.” In this panel the Saviour is shown emerging from the tomb and while still bound with the grave clothes, the Spirit of Life, in the form of a Dove, flies to His breast, and overhead the birds sing at the coming of a new Dawn.

Other features
The church has a fine collection of late Victorian stained glass windows by many famous makers, including Kempe, Burlison and Grylls and Hardman & Co. The reredos above the altar is by the artist Charles Edgar Buckeridge.

It is also known for its octagonal mediaeval font with a palindromic Greek inscription ΝΙΨΟΝΑΝΟΜΗΜΑΤΑΜΗΜΟΝΑΝΟΨΙΝ (Wash my transgressions, not only my face), and a rather battered alabaster tomb fragment which portrays a lily crucifix and a Nottingham alabaster panel depicting Archbishop Thomas Becket.

The church today

St Mary's internal dimensions are
  from west to east
  from north to south (across the transepts)

The church has a wide ministry to many different groups. It is the Civic Church to the City of Nottingham. In the past, the election of the town mayor took place in the church and this tradition continues with a welcome to the new Lord Mayor of Nottingham in a service held each summer.

It is the University Church for the University of Nottingham and several schools and organisations hold annual services here.

In recent years, in addition to its function as a place of worship, St Mary's is the venue for a wide range of concerts and public performances, and is home to the Nottingham Bach Choir.

The assistant curate at St Mary's takes the ancient title 'Lecturer'. This title, fell into disuse in the 17th century, was revived for Rev. John Pennington on his appointment in 1975. The last to hold the post was Rev. Stephen Morris, until 2014.

The church retains the Book of Common Prayer, the traditional liturgical colours and the principal services are sung by a robed choir.

St Mary's retains the historic practice of celebrating the Eucharist at a High Altar Ad orientem with priest and people facing eastwards, rather than the contemporary practice of Versus populum having the priest facing the congregation.

Vicarage

The vicarage of St Mary's was formerly at Washington House on High Pavement, but with the increasing industrialisation of the Lace Market at the end of the 19th century, the church purchased a new residence opposite the castle gatehouse. This was used as St Mary's Vicarage until Canon Eddie Neale retired in 2003.

The adjoining property was the rectory for St Peter's Church, Nottingham.

A joint parish house has now been purchased in The Park Estate.

Notable burials in St Mary's
 John Samon, Mayor of Nottingham, 1416
 Thomas Thurland, Mayor of Nottingham, 1473
 John Holles, 1st Earl of Clare, 1637
 John Holles, 2nd Earl of Clare, 1666
 Eleanor Fitzwilliam, Countess of Tyrconnell, 1681, daughter of John Holles, 1st Earl of Clare
 Lady Jane, Dowager Countess of Valentia 1683/4, widow of Francis Annesley, 1st Viscount Valentia, daughter of Sir John Stanhope.
 Chambre Brabazon, 5th Earl of Meath, 1715
 Lady Mary Brabazon, daughter of Chambre Brabazon, 5th Earl of Meath, 1737
 Thomas Berdmore, dentist to King George III, 1785
 George Africanus, 1834
 Robert Aldridge, Vicar of St Mary's (1598–1616)

Notable marriages in the church
George James Bruere, later Governor of Bermuda, 1743
Alexander Manson MD, pioneer in the use of iodine in medicine, 1814.

Bells and clock
There are twelve bells in the ring.Dawson, George A., 1995, The Church bells of Nottinghamshire Part II.

 Treble Eijsbouts Astensis me fecit Anno MCMLXXX. The Society of Sherwood Youths gave me. "Their sound is gone forth unto all lands". Canon M.J. Jackson, Vicar, S. Yarnell and E. Mottram, Churchwardens. (E) Eayre and Smith.
 2nd Eijsbouts Astensis me fecit Anno MCMLXXX. The Parochial Church Council gave me. "God is gone up with a merry noise". Canon M.J. Jackson, Vicar, S. Yarnell and E. Mottram, Churchwardens. (E) Eayre and Smith.
 3rd C. & G. Mears, Founders, London, Recast 1856. J.W. Brooks, Vicar. W. Dearden, J. Coope, Churchwardens. Recast Gillett & Johnston, Croydon, 1935.
 4th Raised by Scrope Beardsmore, Vicar DD. Richd Lambert and John Wyer, Churchwardens. The Hon'able Wm. Howe & John Plumtree Esqrs – Members for the Town Subscription, 1761. Lester & Pack Fecit. Recast, Gillett & Johnston, Croydon, 1935.
 5th By Subscription. Revd. Scrope Beardsmore DD. Vicar. G. Browne, H. Ward, J. Burgess Ch. Wardens. 1765. Sodales Musici Nottinghamiensis Restaureverunt. Lester & Pack of London Fecit. Recast Gillett & Johnston, Croydon, 1935.
 6th By Subscription Revd. Scrope Beardsmore DD. Vicar. G. Browne, H. Ward, J. Burgess Ch. Wardens. 1765. Intactum Sileo Percute, Dulce Cano. Lester & Pack of London Fecit. Recast Gillett & Johnston, Croydon, 1935.

 7th . (I. Edwards, I. Sweetaple. Churchwardens 1699. Recast Gillett & Johnston, Croydon, 1935.
 8th Robert Aldredg, Vicar, Ralphe Shaw, Henrie Allvie, Wardens. 1613. Recast Gillett & Johnston, Croydon, 1935.
 9th Hee Campana Sacra Filet Trinitate Beata. W. Sturrup, T. Graye. Wardens. 1690. Recast Gillett & Johnston, Croydon, 1935.
 10th . R.A.V. M.G. 1605. W.L. Recast Gillett & Johnston, Croydon, 1935.
 11th . Richard Hunte Major, Nicholas Sherwyn, Richard Iohnson, Iohn Gregorie, Robert Alvie, Peter Clarke, Humfrey Bonner, Richard Morehaghe, Anker Jackson, Aldermen, 1595. Also four impressions of the coat of arms of Elizabeth I alternating with four signs of the Henry Oldfield foundry.
 Tenor Revd. Scrope Beardsmore DD. Vicar. G. Browne, H. Ward, I. Burgess, Ch. Wardens. 1765. I will sound and resound unto thy people, O Lord, With my sweet voice, and call them to thy word, I tole the tune that  is to such as live amiss, But sweet my sound seems unto them who hope for joyful Bliss.'' Lester & Pack of London Fecit. Recast Gillett & Johnston, Croydon, 1935.

The first record of a tower clock dates from 1707 when a clock was installed by Richard Roe of Epperstone. This was replaced in 1807 by a clock by Thomas Hardy of Nottingham. The 1707 clock was moved to Staunton church.

The current tower clock which dates from 1936 was installed by George & Francis Cope. It was the first electric auto-wind clock by that firm.

In May 2022, the bell tower walls were identified as needing structural repair due to loads thrust upon the supporting timbers by the swinging action of the bells. No regular bellringing was possible until completion of work, anticipated to cost £165,000, has been finished.

Music

Choir
There are three choral services a week – Wednesday Evensong, Sunday Eucharist and Sunday Evensong.  Under the leadership of John Keys, the Choir of St Mary's is highly regarded.  Renowned for its versatility and wide repertoire it performs music from plainsong through to world premieres, performs regularly in concert on its own and with St Mary's resident orchestra, The Orchestra of the Restoration. Organ and Choral Scholarships are available to students in full-time higher education.

Organ
The organ is by Marcussen & Søn of Denmark and is a fine example of a neo-classical style instrument. It was installed in 1973 by the organist of the time, David Butterworth. It has 25 speaking stops and is a small organ for a church of this size. Nevertheless, it is an instrument of the highest quality which adequately gives musical support to choir and congregation as well as serving as a solo instrument.

Organists
There are records of organs in the church in the late 16th and early 17th centuries, but no record of any of the organists from this period has been found.

Organ scholars

 David Gostick: 1997–1998 (now director of music of Wimborne Minster)
 Alistair Kirk: 1998
 Richard Leach: 1999–2000
 Simon Williams: 2000–2003
 Christopher Burton: 2003–2004
 Jamal Sutton: 2004–2005
 Nicola Harrington: 2005
 Ben Lewis-Smith: 2006–2007
 Simon Williams: 2007–2009
 Max Puller: 2009–2010
 Dominic Wong: 2010–2011
 Edward Byrne: 2019–2021

References in literature

The church is mentioned in chapter 15 of Sons and Lovers by D.H. Lawrence.

In the ballad Robin Hood and the Monk, Robin attends mass at St Mary's. The ballad is written in a manuscript dating from about 1450.

See also
 All Saints' Church, Nottingham
 List of church restorations and alterations by Temple Moore
 St Peter's Church, Nottingham

References

External links

Choir website
 Pictures of St Mary's from Nottingham21
See St Mary's on Google Street View.

St Mary's Church, Nottingham
Saint Mary
Saint Mary
Saint Mary
Temple Moore buildings
Saint Mary